The Fontanelle Observer is an American weekly newspaper focused on the news of Fontanelle, Iowa, and founded in 1863 by the Gow brothers (one of whom was James M. Gow). Its news is partly digitized via the website of the Creston News Advertiser.

The newspaper passed to Indiana native Manley Albert Rany (1857–1914) in 1881. During his ownership, Will Pruitt also ran the paper under lease for a few years.

William H. McClure became its owner and publisher in 1894, remaining in the role until 1915.

The newspaper was originally known as The Fontanelle Observer (1863–1883), then Fontanelle Weekly Observer (1883–1885), Fontanelle Observer (1885–1893) and The Observer (1893–1904). It has since reverted to its original name.

A fire destroyed the newspaper's office in early 1913. William H. McClure was forced to use the presses of the Greenfield Transcript and the Adair News. The architect of today's incarnation, in 1918, was Ray Williamson (d. 1976) of Creston.

The newspaper celebrated its centenary on December 5, 1963.

Editors and publishers

Below are the newspaper's editors and publishers between 1904 and 1920.

William H. McClure (1859–1915), April 14, 1904 to August 12, 1915
William H. McClure and Sons, August 19, 1915 to March 20, 1919
Don D. McClure (1881–1953), March 27, 1919 to December 30, 1920

Online
Content for The Fontanelle Observer appears on the website of the Creston News Advertiser, which is owned by Shaw Media.

References

External links
The Fontanelle Observer page at CrestonNews.com
The Fontanelle Observers Facebook page

Newspapers published in Iowa
Publications established in 1863
1863 establishments in Iowa